The 1990 Georgia lieutenant gubernatorial election was held on November 6, 1990, to elect the lieutenant governor of Georgia, concurrently with the 1990 gubernatorial election, as well as elections to the United States Senate and elections to the United States House of Representatives and various state and local elections. Georgia is one of 21 states that elects its lieutenant governor separately from its governor.

Incumbent Democratic lieutenant governor Zell Miller retired to run for governor. Democrats nominated State Senator Pierre Howard who defeated Republican nominee Matt Towery.

Democratic primary

Candidates

Advanced to runoff
 Pierre Howard, State Senator from Decatur
 Joe Kennedy, State Senator from Claxton

Defeated in primary
 George Berry, State Commissioner of Industry, Trade, and Tourism, former Deputy Chief Administrative Officer for Mayor of Atlanta Ivan Allen Jr., former Chief Administrative Officer for Mayor of Atlanta Sam Massell, and former Atlanta Commissioner of Aviation
 Jim Pannell, State Representative from Savannah
 Frank I. Bailey, Jr., State Representative from Riverdale
 Lawrence 'Bud' Stumbaugh, State Senator from Stone Mountain
 J. B. Stoner, segregationist and perennial candidate
 Bobby L. Hill, former State Representative from Savannah
 James W. 'Jim' Goolsby

Results

Runoff Results

Republican Primary

Candidates
 Matt Towery
 Janice Horton, former Democratic State Senator from McDonough
 Ann Hall

Results

General election

Results

See also
1990 United States gubernatorial elections
1990 Georgia gubernatorial election
1990 United States Senate election in Georgia
1990 United States House of Representatives elections in Georgia
State of Georgia
Lieutenant Governors of Georgia

References

1990 elections in the United States
Lieutenant Governors of Georgia (U.S. state)